Angelus Memorial Park, previously known as Evergreen Memorial Cemetery, is located in Anchorage, Alaska. Marie Smith Jones, last Native speaker of the Eyak language, is buried there.

See also 
 List of cemeteries in Alaska

References

External links
 

Buildings and structures in Anchorage, Alaska
Cemeteries in Alaska